WQMY (channel 53) is a television station licensed to Williamsport, Pennsylvania, United States, serving Northeastern Pennsylvania as an affiliate of MyNetworkTV. It is owned by locally based New Age Media, LLC, alongside Hazleton-licensed Fox affiliate and company flagship WOLF-TV (channel 56); New Age also provides certain services to Scranton-licensed CW affiliate WSWB (channel 38) under a local marketing agreement (LMA) with MPS Media. All three stations, in turn, are operated under a master service agreement by the Sinclair Broadcast Group. The stations share studios on PA 315 in the Fox Hill section of Plains Township; WQMY's transmitter is located on Bald Eagle Mountain. However, newscasts have originated from the facilities of sister station and CBS affiliate WSBT-TV in South Bend, Indiana since January 2017. There is no separate website for WQMY; instead, it is integrated with that of sister station WOLF-TV.

Although WQMY transmits a digital signal of its own, it does not reach the two major cities in the market, Scranton and Wilkes-Barre. Therefore, the station is simulcast on WOLF-TV's third digital subchannel (56.3) from its transmitter on Penobscot Knob near Mountain Top.

History

As a WOLF satellite
On December 30, 1988, the station signed on an analog signal on UHF channel 53. It was the second full-time satellite of Fox affiliate WOLF-TV (then on analog UHF channel 38) owned by Scranton TV Partners. Using the call letters WDZA, in which they changed to WILF in 1990, this station was established to improve coverage of its parent station in the northern and western parts of the Scranton/Wilkes-Barre market and serve portions of the Pennsylvania side of the adjacent Binghamton and Elmira markets, which themselves would not receive local Fox affiliates until April 1996 and mid-1997. On November 1, 1998, then-owner Pegasus Television changed channel 38's call letters to the current WSWB and made it the area's second WB affiliate after low-powered WYLN-LP in Hazleton dropped the network. Fox programming remained on channel 38's former satellite, WWLF in Hazleton, which picked up the WOLF-TV calls. WILF remained as a repeater of WSWB. WSWB/WILF also picked up UPN as a secondary affiliation. Select programming from the network aired on Saturday nights (since The WB did not offer programs then) without the branding. For the last three years of its affiliation with UPN, the station aired America's Next Top Model in the 8 p.m. timeslot, followed at 9 p.m. by WWE Friday Night SmackDown. Whenever Top Model was in repeats, it would air Veronica Mars instead. All UPN programming in pattern was available on cable via superstation WWOR-TV from New York City (which served Pike County, which is part of the New York DMA) or WPSG from Philadelphia (which served Lehigh and Northampton counties, which are part of the Philadelphia DMA); cable systems in some areas carried WLYH-TV from Harrisburg instead.

Pegasus declared bankruptcy in June 2004 over a dispute with DirecTV, which was co-owned with Fox by News Corporation, over marketing of the satellite service in rural areas. The Pegasus station group was sold in August 2006 to private investment firm CP Media, LLC of Wilkes-Barre for $55.5 million. Eventually, CP Media formed a new broadcasting company, New Age Media. For the first time in its history, WSWB was no longer co-owned with WOLF-TV. However, the new owner entered into a local marketing agreement (LMA) so the stations could continue to be commonly operated.

As a MyNetworkTV affiliate; conversion into a separate station
On January 24, 2006, the respective parent companies of UPN and The WB, CBS Corporation and the Warner Bros. Entertainment division of Time Warner, announced that they would dissolve the two networks to create The CW Television Network, a joint venture between the two media companies that initially featured programs from its two predecessor networks as well as new series specifically produced for The CW. Subsequently, on February 22, 2006, News Corporation announced the launch of MyNetworkTV, a network operated by Fox Television Stations and its syndication division Twentieth Television that was created to primarily to provide network programming to UPN and WB stations that The CW decided against affiliating based on their local viewership standing in comparison to the outlet that The CW ultimately chose as its charter outlets, giving these stations another option besides converting to a general entertainment independent format.

On May 1, 2006, in an announcement by New Age Media, WILF was named as MyNetworkTV's charter affiliate for the Scranton/Wilkes-Barre market and would sever its simulcast of WSWB to become an independently programmed outlet; concurrently, WSWB was announced as the market's charter CW affiliate, a choice that was made apparent as that station had already maintained affiliations with both The WB and UPN. Since WILF's signal was more or less unviewable in the Scranton/Wilkes-Barre area, it was also announced that its programming would be simulcast over a new third digital subchannel of WOLF-TV. WILF changed its call letters to the current WQMY on July 7 to reflect the upcoming affiliation change. WQMY became a charter affiliate of MyNetworkTV when that network launched on September 5, at which time, the station ceased operating as a full-time WSWB satellite and introduced a separate programming lineup and branding. WSWB became a CW charter affiliate when that network launched two weeks later on September 18. On May 8, 2010, WQMY began re-broadcasting live Philadelphia Union MLS telecasts from ABC affiliate WPVI-TV.

On September 25, 2013, New Age Media announced that it would sell most of its stations, including WQMY and WOLF-TV, to the Sinclair Broadcast Group. On October 31, 2014, New Age Media requested the dismissal of its application to sell WQMY; the next day, Sinclair purchased the non-license assets of the stations it planned to buy from New Age Media and began operating them through a master service agreement.

On May 8, 2017, Sinclair entered into an agreement to acquire Chicago-based Tribune Media – which, through a shared services agreement with owner Dreamcatcher Broadcasting, has operated ABC affiliate WNEP-TV (channel 16) since December 2013 – for $3.9 billion, plus the assumption of $2.7 billion in debt held by Tribune. The complicated SSA relationships that Sinclair has in the Scranton–Wilkes–Barre market with WOLF, WSWB and WQMY – the former two of which are currently the only legal television duopoly in the market – created an ownership entanglement, as WNEP and WOLF rank among the market's four highest-rated stations, and the market has too few independently owned full-power stations to permit a second legal duopoly in any event. (Sinclair CEO Christopher Ripley cited Scranton–Wilkes–Barre as one of three markets, out of fourteen where ownership conflicts exist between the two groups, where the proposed acquisition would likely result in divestitures). To alleviate some of the regulatory issues that the deal incurred by selling certain stations to both independent and affiliated third-party companies, on April 24, 2018, Sinclair announced that it would sell the non-license assets of WOLF-TV, WQMY, and WSWB and the full assets of eight other stations – Sinclair-operated KOKH-TV in Oklahoma City, WRLH-TV in Richmond, KDSM-TV in Des Moines and WXLV-TV in Greensboro/Winston-Salem/High Point, and Tribune-owned WPMT in Harrisburg and WXMI in Grand Rapids – to Standard Media Group (an independent broadcast holding company formed by private equity firm Standard General to assume ownership of and absolve ownership conflicts involving the aforementioned stations) for $441.1 million. Sinclair concurrently exercised its option to buy WOLF-TV and WQMY – the latter of which, for regulatory purposes, will continue to be licensed as a satellite of WOLF-TV – to allow Standard Media Group to acquire the stations outright; Standard will concurrently acquire the WOLF-TV license, which is permitted under Federal Communications Commission (FCC) ownership regulations as WSWB is not ranked as one of the top-four stations in the market.

Three weeks after the FCC's July 18 vote to have the deal reviewed by an administrative law judge amid "serious concerns" about Sinclair's forthrightness in its applications to sell certain conflict properties, on August 9, 2018, Tribune announced it would terminate the Sinclair deal, intending to seek other M&A opportunities. Tribune also filed a breach of contract lawsuit in the Delaware Chancery Court, alleging that Sinclair engaged in protracted negotiations with the FCC and the DOJ over regulatory issues, refused to sell stations in markets where it already had properties, and proposed divestitures to parties with ties to Sinclair executive chair David D. Smith that were rejected or highly subject to rejection to maintain control over stations it was required to sell. The termination of the Sinclair sale agreement places uncertainty for the future of Standard Media's purchases of WOLF/WQMY/WSWB and the other four Tribune- and Sinclair-operated stations included in that deal, which were predicated on the closure of the Sinclair–Tribune merger.

Programming
Syndicated programming on WQMY includes The People's Court, Judge Mathis and Family Feud.

WQMY also airs Philadelphia Phillies over-the-air games syndicated from WCAU and WPHL-TV, as well as New York Mets over-the-air games syndicated from WPIX.

Technical information

Subchannels
The station's digital signal is multiplexed:

WQMY multiplexes its signal in order to broadcast WOLF in HD and WSWB to the Lycoming County area. In mid-2010, WQMY started routing direct HD signals to various cable companies in northeast Pennsylvania.

Analog-to-digital conversion
WQMY shut down its analog signal, over UHF channel 53, on February 17, 2009, the original target date in which full-power television stations in the United States were to transition from analog to digital broadcasts under federal mandate (which was later pushed back to June 12, 2009). The station's digital signal remained on its pre-transition UHF channel 29. Through the use of PSIP, digital television receivers display the station's virtual channel as its former UHF analog channel 53, which was among the high band UHF channels (52-69) that were removed from broadcasting use as a result of the transition.

References

External links
Official website
WOLF-TV "Fox 56"

MyNetworkTV affiliates
Television channels and stations established in 1988
1988 establishments in Pennsylvania
QMY
Sinclair Broadcast Group
Philadelphia Union broadcasters
Major League Soccer over-the-air television broadcasters